Ashworth Moor Reservoir is an upland water supply reservoir amongst the Pennines in Greater Manchester, England close to the A680 road between Rochdale and Edenfield. It is south of Scout Moor Wind Farm.

Drinking water reservoirs in England
Geography of the Metropolitan Borough of Rochdale
Reservoirs in Greater Manchester